The Dirt n Dust Festival is an annual sporting and music festival held in the rural town of Julia Creek,  west of Townsville, Queensland, Australia. It was one of the biggest annual events of its type in Queensland.

The festival takes place over a three-day weekend in April each year. 

In previous years it has featured triathlon, horse races, bull rides, bog snorkelling, Australia's Best Butt Competition and live country music artists. The triathlon was renowned for being one of the toughest triathlons in Australia, particularly because of its extreme, tough conditions. About 3,500 patrons attended annually over the weekend for a full, authentic festival experience.

The triathlon was the festival's main event. It featured an 800-metre creek swim, a 25-kilometre bike ride on the Flinders Highway and a five-kilometre run around the town. The triathlon was won five times by Brisbane triathlete Sam Betten. World-renowned triathletes like Brad Bevan, Courtney Atkinson, Loretta Harrop and Emma Jackson have also competed in the event.

The event previously received funding under Tourism and Events Queensland's Regional Development Program. The non-for-profit organisation spent a considerable amount of time lobbying for sponsorship and funding through various sources each year.

Due to the coronavirus pandemic, the 2020 and 2021 festivals were cancelled.

In July 2021, it was announced that due to a lack of volunteers and there being no committee to run the event, the Dirt N Dust Festival would be permanently discontinued and there would be no more festivals held. This decision was reversed two months later with the announcement of a new volunteer committee taking over the organisation of the festival for its return in 2022. 

In line with the community vision, the revived 2022 festival, with changes to the event line-up seeing the Triathlon replaced with an Adventure Run and the Bull Ride extended to the Dirt n Dust Rodeo.

The dates for the coming event are 21 - 23 April, 2023 in Julia Creek, Outback Queensland.  Accommodation is limited, so book ahead, with camping onsite.  Tickets released in the lead up to the event.

See also

List of festivals in Australia

References

External links
 

Folk festivals in Australia
Festivals in Queensland
North West Queensland
1995 establishments in Australia
Festivals established in 1995